The A3 Highway is an A-Grade trunk road in Sri Lanka. It connects the Peliyagoda with Negombo-Puttalam.

The highway A3 passes through Peliyagoda, Wattala, Mahabage, Kandana, Ja-Ela, Seeduwa, Katunayake, Negombo, Negombo Kochchikade, Bolawatte, Wennapuwa, Katuneriya, Marawila, Mahawewa, Madampe, Kakkapalliya, Chilaw, Arachchikattu, Battuluoya,  Mundel, Madurankuliya and Palavi to reach Puttalam.

A03 highway